Michael J. (Mike) Karels is an American Software Engineer and one of the key people in history of BSD UNIX.

A graduate of University of Notre Dame with a Bachelor of Science in Microbiology.  Mike went on to University of California, Berkeley for his advanced degree in Microbiology. 
Mike had access to the department's computer and since the administrator of that PDP-11 did not have enough time, Mike started helping him and then making changes to the system.
Mike started his contribution to Unix with the 2.9BSD release, distributed for the PDP-11.
When Mike saw a job posting with the Computer Systems Research Group in the BSD project, he decided to jump in.
In 1982, Mike took over Bill Joy's responsibilities when Mr. Joy left CSRG, and was the system architect for 4.3BSD, the most important BSD release and the base of the development for a number of commercial Unix flavors available today, including Solaris. This release was introduced to the world in deep detail through the all-time famous book, The Design and Implementation of the 4.3BSD UNIX Operating System, with black cover and smiling beastie. Mike was a CSRG principal programmer for 8 years.

Mike worked closely with Van Jacobson on a number of widely accepted algorithms
in TCP implementation. Including the Jacobson/Karels algorithm TCP slow start and the routing radix tree are probably the most famous ones.
Mike spends little time taking credit for this work, and on the other hand, uses every opportunity to mention the names of people who had in one way or other some role or contribution to the TCP/IP implementation in Unix.

In 1993, the USENIX Association gave a Lifetime Achievement Award (Flame) to the Computer Systems Research Group at University of California, Berkeley, honoring 180 individuals, including Karels, who contributed to the CSRG's 4.4BSD-Lite release.
 
Later, Mike moved to BSDi (Berkeley Software Design) and designed BSD/OS, which was, for years, the only commercially available BSD style Unix on Intel platform. BSD/OS is a very reliable OS platform designed for Internet services. BSDi software asset was bought by Wind River in April 2001, and Mike joined Wind River as the Principal Technologist for the BSD/OS platform.

In 2009, Mike was Sr Principal Engineer at McAfee. In 2015 he worked for Intel and later for Forcepoint LLC.

Bibliography

 S. Leffler, M. McKusick, M. Karels, J. Quarterman: The Design and Implementation of the 4.3BSD UNIX Operating System, Addison-Wesley, January 1989, . German translation published June 1990, . Japanese translation published June 1991,  (out of print).
 S. Leffler, M. McKusick: The Design and Implementation of the 4.3BSD UNIX Operating System Answer Book, Addison-Wesley, April 1991, . Japanese translation published January 1992, 
 M. McKusick, K. Bostic, M. Karels, J. Quarterman: The Design and Implementation of the 4.4BSD Operating System, Addison-Wesley, April 1996, . French translation published 1997, International Thomson Publishing, Paris, France, .

References

External links 
 Mike Karels at Unix Guru Universe's Unix Contributors
 Mike Karels Linkedin Page

American computer programmers
American computer scientists
BSD people
Living people
Year of birth missing (living people)